Mahakavi Krittibas Ojha (1381–1461) was a medieval Bengali poet. His major contribution to Bengali literature and culture was Indian epic Rāmāyaṇa in Bengali. His work, the Śrīrām Pā̃cālī, is popularly known as the Krittivasi Ramayan. His work, edited by Jaygopal Tarkalankar, was published by the Serampore Mission Press.

Life
Krittibas Ojha was born in a Brahmin family at Phulia village of modern-day Nadia district in the Indian state of Paschimbanga (West Bengal). He was the eldest among his father Banamali Ojha's six sons and one daughter.

The word "Krittibas" is an epithet of Hindu god Shiva. It is known that when Krittibas was born, his grandfather Murari Ojha was preparing for a pilgrimage to Chandaneswar in Odisha, hence the child was named after Shiva, the predominant deity of the nearest Odisha pilgrimage to Bengal. At the age of 11, Krittibas was sent to North Bengal (in other opinion, to Nabadwip) for higher studies. After finishing studies he was traditionally honoured by the King of Gauda himself by the offerings of a garland, some sandal water and a silk scarf. Upon returning to his home at Phulia, he translated the Valmiki Ramayana into Bengali.

References

1381 births
1461 deaths
Bengali Hindus
Bengali male poets
Hindu poets
People from Nadia district
Poets from West Bengal
Bengali-language writers
15th-century Bengali poets